Plinia rivularis, commonly known as yva poroity, or  is a species of plant in the family Myrtaceae.

Distribution 
Plinia rivularis is found in coastal forests, atlantic rainforest, and high altitude forests, in Argentina, Paraguay, Uruguay, Brazil, Venezuela, and Trinidad.

Description 
The plant is an evergreen tree which can grow to between 6 and 11 metres tall. It produces edible, reddish-orange fruit, up to 20mm in diameter. The leaves are between 7.5 and 10cm long, and between 3 and 4cm wide.

References

rivularis
Crops originating from the Americas
Tropical fruit
Fruits originating in South America
Cauliflory
Fruit trees
Berries